Rialto Theatre may refer to:

Canada

 Rialto Theatre (Montreal), a former theatre that is a National Historic Site of Canada
 Rialto Theatre (Ottawa), 1943–1991; demolished 1991, within one year of acquisition by Cineplex Odeon and renaming as "The Phoenix"

Netherlands
 Rialto (theater), a theatre in Amsterdam's De Pijp neighborhood.

United States

Arizona
 Rialto Theatre (Tucson, Arizona), a performing arts venue in Tucson, Arizona, listed on the NRHP in Arizona

Arkansas
 Rialto Theatre (El Dorado, Arkansas), listed on the NRHP in Arkansas
 Rialto Theater (Morrilton, Arkansas)
 Rialto Theater (Searcy, Arkansas), listed on the National Register of Historic Places (NRHP) in Arkansas

California
 Rialto Theater (Los Angeles), part of the historic Broadway Theater District
 Rialto Cinemas, three California movie theaters in Berkeley, El Cerrito, and Sebastopol 
 Rialto Theatre (South Pasadena, California), listed on the NRHP in California

Colorado
 Rialto Theater (Loveland, Colorado), listed on the NRHP in Colorado

Florida
 Rialto Theatre (Tampa, Florida), built in 1926 and part of the NRHP listed Upper North Franklin Street Commercial District

Georgia 
 Rialto Center for the Arts, a theatre at Georgia State University, Atlanta
 Rialto Theater (Augusta, Georgia), opened September 23, 1918.

Illinois
 Rialto Square Theatre, Joliet, Illinois, known also as Rubens Rialto Square Theater, listed on the NRHP in Illinois

Indiana
 Rialto Theater (Fort Wayne, Indiana)

Kentucky
 Rialto Theater (Louisville, Kentucky)

Montana
 Rialto Theater (Deer Lodge, Montana), listed on the NRHP in Montana

Nebraska
 Rialto Theater (Omaha, Nebraska)

New Jersey
 Rialto (Westfield, New Jersey)

New York
 Rialto Theater (Monticello, New York), listed on the NRHP in New York
 Rialto Theatre (New York City) was a movie palace and later a theatrical performance space at 1481 Broadway that operated from 1916 to 2002

North Carolina
  The Rialto (Raleigh, North Carolina)

Texas
 Rialto Theater (Aransas Pass, Texas), a performing arts and music venue on the south Texas Coast
 Rialto Theater (Beeville, Texas), listed on the NRHP in Texas
 Rialto Theater (San Antonio, Texas)

Washington
 Rialto Theater (Tacoma, Washington), listed on the NRHP in Washington

Wyoming
 Rialto Theater (Casper, Wyoming), listed on the NRHP in Wyoming

See also

 Rialto (disambiguation)